Csaba Hütter (born 10 May 1943) is a Hungarian agrarian engineer and former Communist politician, who served as Minister of Agriculture and Food between 1989 and 1990.

References
 Bölöny, József – Hubai, László: Magyarország kormányai 1848–2004 [Cabinets of Hungary 1848–2004], Akadémiai Kiadó, Budapest, 2004 (5th edition).

1943 births
Living people
People from Ada, Serbia
Members of the Hungarian Socialist Workers' Party
Agriculture ministers of Hungary
Members of the National Assembly of Hungary (1975–1980)
Members of the National Assembly of Hungary (1980–1985)
Members of the National Assembly of Hungary (1985–1990)